Tamulpur Assembly constituency) is one of the 126 assembly constituencies of Assam Legislative Assembly. Tamulpur forms part of the Kokrajhar Lok Sabha constituency.

Members of Legislative assembly

Election Results

2021 by-poll

References

External links 
 

Assembly constituencies of Assam